The Last Seduction is a 1994 American neo-noir erotic thriller film directed by John Dahl, featuring Linda Fiorentino, Peter Berg, and Bill Pullman. The film was produced by ITC Entertainment and distributed by October Films. Fiorentino's performance garnered widespread critical acclaim and generated talk of an Oscar nomination, but she was deemed ineligible because the film was shown on HBO before its theatrical release. October Films and ITC Entertainment sued the Academy, but were unable to make Fiorentino eligible for a nomination.

Plot
Bridget Gregory works as a telemarketing manager in New York City. Her husband, Clay, is training to be a doctor and is heavily in debt to a loan shark. He arranges to sell stolen pharmaceutical cocaine to two drug dealers. The transaction becomes tense when the buyers pull a gun, but to Clay's surprise, they eventually pay him $700,000. Clay is left shaken, and upon his return home, he slaps Bridget after she insults him. She then flees their apartment with the cash while he is in the shower.

On her way to Chicago, she stops in Beston, a small town near Buffalo. There she meets Mike Swale, a local man back from a whirlwind marriage in Buffalo that he refuses to talk about. He tries to pick up Bridget, and she proceeds to use him for mere sexual gratification during her stay in town. Adept at word games and mirror writing, and with an imminent return to her hometown in mind, Bridget changes her name to Wendy Kroy (as a reversal of 'New York') and gets a job at the insurance company where, coincidentally, Mike works. Their relationship is strained by her manipulative behavior and the fact that he is falling for her.

When Mike tells her how to find out if a man is cheating on his wife by reading his credit reports, Bridget invents a plan based on selling murders to cheated wives. She suggests they start with Lance Collier, a cheating, wife-beating husband residing in Florida. This proves to be the last straw for Mike, and he leaves her alone in his place after an argument. Meanwhile, the loan shark breaks Clay's thumb for not repaying his loan. Fearing for his health and in dire financial straits, he hires a private detective, Harlan, to retrieve the money from his wife.

Harlan traces her phone area code, travels to Beston, and accosts Bridget at gunpoint right after her argument with Mike. Bridget purposely crashes her car after tricking Harlan into removing his seat belt, resulting in his death. Because Harlan was Black, she uses local racial prejudice to persuade the police to close the case without further investigation. Bridget then resumes her manipulation of Mike and pretends to travel to Florida to kill Collier. Instead, she goes to Buffalo to meet Mike's ex-wife, Trish. Upon returning, Bridget shows Mike the money she stole from Clay, claiming it is her cut of the life insurance payout from the new widow.

Bridget claims to have done it so they can live together and then tries to persuade him that he must also commit a similar murder so they will be even and to prove that he loves her. She tries to talk Mike into killing a tax lawyer in New York City who is cheating old ladies out of their homes. At first, he refuses, but later agrees after receiving a letter from Trish saying she is moving to Beston. The letter was forged by Bridget to change his mind.

Mike goes to New York and breaks into the apartment of the supposed attorney, who turns out to be Clay. After Mike handcuffs Clay, Clay realizes what is happening when Mike mentions Bridget's alias and convinces Mike of the truth by showing him a photo of himself and Bridget together. They then hatch a plot to double-cross her.

Bridget arrives, and the still-immobilized Clay, who has been clever enough to predict most of Bridget's actions but fails to understand her sociopathy, tries to make amends with her. Instead, she empties a pepper spray bottle down his throat, killing him. She tells a stunned Mike to rape her. When he refuses, she tells him she knows the truth about Trish, who is transgender, and goads him by calling him a homophobic slur. This causes Mike to have rough sex with her while acting out a rape fantasy.

Unbeknownst to Mike, Bridget has dialed 9-1-1, and she coaxes him into "confessing" to Clay's murder as part of the role-play. Mike is arrested for rape and murder, while she escapes with the cash, later calmly destroying the only evidence that could have been used in Mike's defense.

Cast
 Linda Fiorentino as Bridget Gregory
 Peter Berg as Mike Swale
 Bill Pullman as Clay Gregory
 Bill Nunn as Harlan
 J. T. Walsh as Frank Griffith
 Dean Norris as Shep
 Herb Mitchell as Bob Trotter

Production
Screenwriter Steve Barancik said he believed the film was originally pitched to ITC Entertainment as a "standard Skinemax" low-budget movie, even though the filmmakers had "an under-the-radar intention to make a good movie." Linda Fiorentino said of accepting the role, "After I read that script, I was in Arizona and I got in a car and drove six hours to get to the meeting because I had never read anything so unique in terms of a female character. And I walked in the meeting with John Dahl, the director, and I said, 'John, you are not allowed to hire anyone but me for this film.' And I wasn't kidding."

ITC Entertainment executives were upset with a scene in which Linda Fiorentino is dressed as a cheerleader and wears suspenders over her breasts. Barancik recalled, "Apparently, a guy from the company who was monitoring things and watching the dailies saw the suspenders over Linda's nipples and shouted out, 'Are we making an art movie?!' He shut down production and called the principals of the movie on the carpet, and they all had to pledge that they had no artistic pretensions." The scene was cut, and the sexual role-playing theme was lost.

Peter Berg said it was a Linda Fiorentino's idea to shoot the chain-link-fence sex scene in that way. "She said, 'John, get a camera,' and she climbed up on me against that fence and told John Dahl to shoot it, and that was the scene. She thought of it, she conceived it, she executed it. It was awesome."

Reception
The Last Seduction received critical acclaim. It holds a 94% rating on Rotten Tomatoes based on 51 reviews. On Metacritic it has a score of 85 out of 100 based on 12 reviews, indicating "universal acclaim." Roger Ebert gave the film four out of four stars, highlighting Fiorentino's ability to project her character with dry humor and a freedom from Hollywood conventions typically surrounding a female antagonist. He wrote in the Chicago Sun-Times:

Ebert later ranked the film fifth on his year-end list of 1994's best movies.

Year-end lists 
 5th – Roger Ebert, Chicago Sun Times
 6th – Janet Maslin, The New York Times
 8th – Bob Strauss, Los Angeles Daily News
 8th –  Glenn Lovell, San Jose Mercury News
 9th – Todd Anthony, Miami New Times
 10th – Michael Mills, The Palm Beach Post
 Top 10 (listed alphabetically, not ranked) – Eleanor Ringel, The Atlanta Journal-Constitution
 Top 10 (listed alphabetically, not ranked) – Jeff Simon, The Buffalo News
 Honorable mention – Michael MacCambridge, Austin American-Statesman
 Honorable mention – Betsy Pickle, Knoxville News-Sentinel
 Honorable mention – William Arnold, Seattle Post-Intelligencer

Awards and nominations

Legacy

The Last Seduction has gained a cult following over time, and its main character, Bridget Gregory, has been recognized as one of the most iconic femme fatales in film history. In 2019, the British Film Institute included the movie, along with Gone Girl and Death Becomes Her, in a program dedicated to exploring "wickedly compelling female characters on screen." The film was also featured in The Criterion Channel's Neonoir series in July 2021. A sequel, The Last Seduction II, was released in 1999. However, it featured none of the original cast and starred Joan Severance as Bridget Gregory.

Bibliography

References

External links

 
 
 
 
 The Last Seduction at Metacritic

1994 films
1994 crime thriller films
1994 LGBT-related films
American crime thriller films
American erotic thriller films
Films about con artists
Films about domestic violence
Films directed by John Dahl
Films set in Manhattan
Films set in New York (state)
Films shot in New York (state)
American independent films
1994 independent films
Mariticide in fiction
American neo-noir films
ITC Entertainment films
Transgender-related films
1990s English-language films
1990s American films